The eastern gray squirrel (Sciurus carolinensis), also known, particularly outside of North America, as simply the grey squirrel, is a tree squirrel in the genus Sciurus. It is native to eastern North America, where it is the most prodigious and ecologically essential natural forest regenerator. Widely introduced to certain places around the world, the eastern gray squirrel in Europe, in particular, is regarded as an invasive species.

In Europe, Sciurus carolinensis is included since 2016 in the list of Invasive Alien Species of Union concern (the Union list). This implies that this species cannot be imported, bred, transported, commercialized, or intentionally released into the environment in the whole of the European Union.

Distribution
Sciurus carolinensis is native to the eastern and midwestern United States, and to the southerly portions of the central provinces of Canada. The native range of the eastern gray squirrel overlaps with that of the fox squirrel (Sciurus niger), with which it is sometimes confused, although the core of the fox squirrel's range is slightly more to the west. The eastern gray squirrel is found from New Brunswick, through southwestern Quebec and throughout southern Ontario plus in southern Manitoba, south to East Texas and Florida. Breeding eastern gray squirrels are found in Nova Scotia, but whether this population was introduced or came from natural range expansion is not known.

A prolific and adaptable species, the eastern gray squirrel has also been introduced to, and thrives in, several regions of the western United States and in 1966, this squirrel was introduced onto Vancouver Island in Western Canada in the area of Metchosin, and has spread widely from there. They are considered highly invasive and a threat to both the local ecosystem and the native squirrel, the American red squirrel.

Overseas, Eastern gray squirrels in Europe are a concern because they have displaced some of the native squirrels there. They have been introduced into Ireland, Britain, Italy, South Africa, and Australia (where it was extirpated by 1973).

In Ireland, the native squirrel – also colored red – the Eurasian red squirrel S. vulgaris – has been displaced in several eastern counties, though it still remains common in the south and west of the country. The gray squirrel is also an invasive species in Britain; it has spread across the country and has largely displaced the red squirrel. That such a displacement might happen in Italy is of concern, as gray squirrels might spread to other parts of mainland Europe.

Etymology
The generic name, Sciurus, is derived from two Greek words, skia, meaning shadow, and oura, meaning tail. This name alludes to the squirrel sitting in the shadow of its tail. The specific epithet, carolinensis, refers to the Carolinas, where the species was first recorded and where the animal is still extremely common. In the United Kingdom and Canada, it is simply referred to as the "grey squirrel". In the US, "eastern" is used to differentiate the species from the western gray squirrel (Sciurus griseus).

Description

The eastern gray squirrel has predominantly gray fur, but it can have a brownish color. It has a usual white underside as compared to the typical brownish-orange underside of the fox squirrel. It has a large bushy tail. Particularly in urban situations where the risk of predation is reduced, both white – and black-colored individuals are quite often found. The melanistic form, which is almost entirely black, is predominant in certain populations and in certain geographic areas, such as in large parts of southeastern Canada. Melanistic squirrels appear to exhibit a higher cold tolerance than the common gray morph; when exposed to −10 °C, black squirrels showed an 18% reduction in heat loss, a 20% reduction in basal metabolic rate, and an 11% increase to non-shivering thermogenesis capacity when compared to the common gray morph. The black coloration is caused by an incomplete dominant mutation of MC1R, where E+/E+ is a wild type squirrel, E+/EB is brown-black, and EB/EB is black.

They do not display sexual dimorphism, meaning there is no gender difference in size or coloration.

The tracks of an eastern gray squirrel are difficult to distinguish from the related fox squirrel and Abert's squirrel, though the latter's range is almost entirely different from the gray's. Like all squirrels, the eastern gray shows four toes on the front feet and five on the hind feet. The hind foot-pad is often not visible in the track. When bounding or moving at speed, the front foot tracks will be behind the hind foot tracks. The bounding stride can be two to three feet long.

The dental formula of the eastern gray squirrel is 1023/1013 (upper teeth/lower teeth).

 × 2 = 22 total teeth.

Incisors exhibit indeterminate growth, meaning they grow consistently throughout life, and their cheek teeth exhibit brachydont (low-crowned teeth) and bunodont (having tubercles on crowns) structures.

Behavior

Like many members of the family Sciuridae, the eastern gray squirrel is a scatter-hoarder; it hoards food in numerous small caches for later recovery. Some caches are quite temporary, especially those made near the site of a sudden abundance of food which can be retrieved within hours or days for reburial in a more secure site. Others are more permanent and are not retrieved until months later. Each squirrel is estimated to make several thousand caches each season. The squirrels have very accurate spatial memory for the locations of these caches, using distant and nearby landmarks to retrieve them. Smell is used partly to uncover food caches, and also to find food in other squirrels' caches. Scent can be unreliable when the ground is too dry or covered in snow.

Squirrels sometimes use deceptive behavior to prevent other animals from retrieving cached food. For example, they will pretend to bury the object if they feel that they are being watched. They do this by preparing the spot as usual, for instance, digging a hole or widening a crack, miming the placement of the food, while actually concealing it in their mouths, and then covering up the "cache" as if they had deposited the object. They also hide behind vegetation while burying food or hide it high up in trees (if their rival is not arboreal). Such a complex repertoire suggests that the behaviours are not innate, and imply theory of mind thinking.

The eastern gray squirrel is one of very few mammalian species that can descend a tree head-first. It does this by turning its feet so the claws of its hind paws are backward-pointing and can grip the tree bark.

Eastern gray squirrels build a type of nest, known as a drey, in the forks of trees, consisting mainly of dry leaves and twigs. The dreys are roughly spherical, about 30 to 60 cm in diameter and are usually insulated with moss, thistledown, dried grass, and feathers to reduce heat loss. Males and females may share the same nest for short times during the breeding season, and during cold winter spells. Squirrels may share a drey to stay warm. They may also nest in the attic or exterior walls of a house, where they may be regarded as pests, as well as fire hazards due to their habit of gnawing on electrical cables. In addition, squirrels may inhabit a permanent tree den hollowed out in the trunk or a large branch of a tree.

Eastern gray squirrels are crepuscular, or more active during the early and late hours of the day, and tend to avoid the heat in the middle of a summer day. They do not hibernate.

Squirrels are creatures that bite people and rob them of their food. They can attack people by biting their hands. Squirrels can dwell in attics or on rooftops by creating nests. Before burying an acorn, a squirrel actually shovels its face inside of it, making it easier to find afterwards. Squirrels gnaw on items to postpone the appearance of their front teeth. To prevent the lower jaw and cranium from developing into their front teeth once they start to emerge, they gnaw on objects that wear down their teeth.  
Eastern gray squirrels can breed twice a year, but younger and less experienced mothers normally have a single litter per year in the spring. Depending on forage availability, older and more experienced females may breed again in summer. In a year of abundant food, 36% of females bear two litters, but none will do so in a year of poor food. Their breeding seasons are December to February and May to June, though this is slightly delayed in more northern latitudes. The first litter is born in February or March, the second in June or July, though, again, bearing may be advanced or delayed by a few weeks depending on climate, temperature, and forage availability. In any given breeding season, an average of 61 – 66% of females bear young. If a female fails to conceive or loses her young to unusually cold weather or predation, she re-enters estrus and has a later litter. Five days before a female enters estrus, she may attract up to 34 males from up to 500 meters away. Eastern gray squirrels exhibit a form of polyandry, in which the competing males will form a hierarchy of dominance, and the female will mate with multiple males depending on the hierarchy established.

Normally, one to four young are born in each litter, but the largest possible litter size is eight. The gestation period is about 44 days. The young are weaned around 10 weeks, though some may wean up to six weeks later in the wild. They begin to leave the nest after 12 weeks, with autumn born young often wintering with their mother. Only one in four squirrel kits survives to one year of age, with mortality around 55% for the following year. Mortality rates then decrease to around 30% for following years until they increase sharply at eight years of age.

Rarely, eastern gray females can enter estrus as early as five and a half months old, but females are not normally fertile until at least one year of age. Their mean age of first estrus is 1.25 years. The presence of a fertile male will induce ovulation in a female going through estrus. Male eastern grays are sexually mature between one and two years of age. Reproductive longevity for females appears to be over 8 years, with 12.5 years documented in North Carolina. These squirrels can live to be 20 years old in captivity, but in the wild live much shorter lives due to predation and the challenges of their habitat. At birth, their life expectancy is 1–2 years, an adult typically can live to be six, with exceptional individuals making it to 12 years.

Growth and ontogeny 

Newborn gray squirrels weigh 13–18 grams and are entirely hairless and pink, although vibrissae are present at birth. 7–10 days postpartum, the skin begins to darken, just before the juvenile pelage grows in. Lower incisors erupt 19–21 days postpartum, while upper incisors erupt after 4 weeks. Cheek teeth erupt during week 6. Eyes open after 21–42 days, and ears open 3–4 weeks postpartum. Weaning is initiated around 7 weeks postpartum, and is usually finished by week 10, followed by the loss of the juvenile pelage. Full adult body mass is achieved by 8–9 months after birth.

Communication

As in most other mammals, communication among eastern gray squirrel individuals involves both vocalizations and posturing. The species has a quite varied repertoire of vocalizations, including a squeak similar to that of a mouse, a low-pitched noise, a chatter, and a raspy "mehr mehr mehr". Other methods of communication include tail-flicking and other gestures, including facial expressions. Tail flicking and the "kuk" or "quaa" call are used to ward off and warn other squirrels about predators, as well as to announce when a predator is leaving the area. Squirrels also make an affectionate coo-purring sound that biologists call the "muk-muk" sound. This is used as a contact sound between a mother and her kits and in adulthood, by the male when he courts the female during mating season.

The use of vocal and visual communication has been shown to vary by location, based on elements such as noise pollution and the amount of open space. For instance, populations living in large cities generally rely more on the visual signals, due to the generally louder environment with more areas without much visual restriction. However, in heavily wooded areas, vocal signals are used more often due to the relatively lower noise levels and a dense canopy restricting visual range.

Diet

Eastern gray squirrels eat a range of foods, such as tree bark, tree buds, flowers, berries, many types of seeds and acorns, walnuts, and other nuts, like hazelnuts (see picture) and some types of fungi found in the forests, including fly agaric mushrooms (Amanita muscaria). They can cause damage to trees by tearing the bark and eating the soft cambial tissue underneath. In Europe, sycamore (Acer pseudoplatanus L.) and beech (Fagus sylvatica L.) suffer the greatest damage. The seeds and catkins of gymnosperms cedar, hemlock, pine, and spruce are another food source, as well as those of angiosperms such as hickory, oak, and walnut, and truffles.  Mast-Bearing Hardwood Trees are also very important to their diet. These trees help store food like Acorns, Beechnuts, and Hickory Nuts, which are important foods for them during the Spring and Fall months. Red Oak Acorns are found in the Spring, Winter and Fall. White Oak Acorns are found in the Fall and Winter. Hickory and Beechnuts are found in Spring, Winter and Fall. Walnuts are found in Fall and Winter. Buds and flowers are found in Spring and Summer. Fleshy fruits and berries are found in Summer. Fungi Mushrooms are found in Spring, Summer, and Fall. Yellow Popular Seeds are found in Summer, Fall and Winter. The squirrels also raid gardens for wheat, tomatoes, corn, strawberries, and other garden crops. Sometimes they eat the tomato seeds and discard the rest. On occasion, eastern gray squirrels also prey upon insects, frogs, small rodents including other squirrels, and small birds, their eggs, and young. They also gnaw on bones, antlers, and turtle shells – likely as a source of minerals scarce in their normal diet. In urban and suburban areas, these squirrels scavenge for food in trash bins. However, these foods aren't safe for them to digest because they include sugar, fat, as well as additives that can make them sick. Eastern gray squirrels are thought to be herbivores, but they are Omnivores.

Eastern gray squirrels have a high enough tolerance for humans to inhabit residential neighborhoods and raid bird feeders for millet, corn, and sunflower seeds. Some people who feed and watch birds for entertainment also intentionally feed seeds and nuts to the squirrels for the same reason. However, in the UK eastern gray squirrels can take a significant proportion of supplementary food from feeders, preventing access and reducing use by wild birds. Attraction to supplementary feeders can increase local bird nest predation, as eastern gray squirrels are more likely to forage near feeders, resulting in increased likelihood of finding nests, eggs and nestlings of small passerines.

Predation
Eastern gray squirrels predators include hawks, weasels, raccoons, bobcats, foxes, domestic and feral cats, snakes, owls, and dogs. Their primary predators are hawks, owls, and snakes. Raccoons and weasels may consume a squirrel depending on where it lives in the United States. Rattlesnakes eat squirrels in California as they are searching for food in a heavy forest. The squirrel is susceptible to be eaten by a fox in the eastern region of the United States.

In its introduced range in South Africa, it has been preyed on by African harrier-hawks. When a predator is approaching the Eastern Gray Squirrel, other squirrels will inform the squirrel of the predator by sending a signal to let the squirrel know. The speed of a squirrel makes it hard for it to be captured by the predators.

Diseases 
Diseases such as Typhus, Plague, and Tularemia are spread by Eastern Gray Squirrels. If not properly treated, these diseases have the potential to kill squirrels. When bitten or exposed to bodily fluids, humans can contract these diseases. Also carried by Eastern Grey Squirrels are parasites such as ringworm, fleas, lice, mites, and ticks which can kill their squirrel host. Their skin may become rough, blotchy, and prone to hair loss due to the mite parasite during the chilly winter months. The parasites are not transferred to people when these squirrels reside in attics or homes. A frequent illness spread by ticks is Lyme disease. Ticks can also spread Rocky Mountain Spotted Fever. It can result in damage to internal organs including the heart and kidney if not properly treated.  An eastern gray squirrel is susceptible to illness. They are susceptible to diseases including fibromatosis and squirrel box. A squirrel with fibromatosis, a virus-induced illness, may grow massive skin tumors all over the body. Blindness could result from a tumor that is discovered close to a squirrels mouth or eye.

However, Eastern Gray Squirrels have had a positive impact on human life. For example, they helped Native Americans access food. In some states like Mississippi, they have helped harvest 2.5 million dollars in crops annually, which helped Mississippi gain 12.5 million dollars.

Habitat 

Eastern gray squirrel are always on the go. As they prepare for the coming days, the squirrels gather their food and hide it in various places. Through the morning and afternoon, squirrels search for food. During their breeding season, a male and female squirrel may occasionally share a nest. A pregnant female squirrel stays by herself in her nest and paternal care of the offspring does not occur. In the wild, eastern gray squirrels can be found inhabiting large areas of mature, dense woodland ecosystems, generally covering 100 acres (40 hectares) of land. These forests usually contain large mast-producing trees such as oaks and hickories, providing ample food sources. Oak-hickory hardwood forests are generally preferred over coniferous forests due to the greater abundance of mast forage. This is why they are found only in parts of eastern Canada which do not contain boreal forest (i.e. they are found in some parts of New Brunswick, in southwestern Quebec, throughout southern Ontario and in southern Manitoba).

Eastern gray squirrels generally prefer constructing their dens upon large tree branches and within the hollow trunks of trees. They also have been known to take shelter within abandoned bird nests. The dens are usually lined with moss plants, thistledown, dried grass, and feathers. These perhaps provide and assist in the insulation of the den, used to reduce heat loss. A cover to the den is usually built afterwards.

Eastern grays squirrels also use dens for protection from prey and helps them look after their young. Young survive 40 percent less if they lived in a leaf nest compared to a den. Squirrels tend to claim 2-3 dens at the same time. Canopy and midstory Trees are used by squirrels to hide from predators such as hawks and owls.

Close to human settlements, eastern gray squirrels are found in parks and back yards of houses within urban environments and in the farmlands of rural environments.

Introductions

The eastern gray squirrel is an introduced species in a variety of locations in western North America: in western Canada, to the southwest corner of British Columbia and to the city of Calgary, Alberta; in the United States, to the states of Washington and Oregon and, in California, to the city of San Francisco and the San Francisco Peninsula area in San Mateo and Santa Clara Counties, south of the city. It has become the most common squirrel in many urban and suburban habitats in western North America, from north of central California to southwest British Columbia.

By the turn of the 20th century, breeding populations of the eastern gray squirrel had been introduced into South Africa, Ireland, Italy, Australia (extirpated by 1973), and the United Kingdom.

In South Africa, though exotic, it is not usually considered an invasive species owing to its small range (only found in the extreme southwestern part of the Western Cape, going north as far as the small farming town of Franschhoek), as well because it inhabits urban areas and places greatly affected by humans, such as agricultural areas and exotic pine plantations. Here, it mostly eats acorns and pine seeds, although it will take indigenous and commercial fruit, as well. Even so, it is unable to use the natural vegetation (fynbos) found in the area, a factor which has helped to limit its spread. It does not come into contact with native squirrels due to geographic isolation (a native tree squirrel, Paraxerus cepapi, is found only in the savanna regions in the northeast of the country) and different habitats.

Gray squirrels were first introduced to Britain in the 1870s, as fashionable additions to estates. In 1921 it was reported in The Times that the Zoological Society of London had released Eastern Greys to breed at liberty in Regents Park:

They spread rapidly across England, and then became established in both Wales and parts of southern Scotland. On mainland Britain, they have almost entirely displaced native red squirrels. Larger than red squirrels and capable of storing up to four times more fat, gray squirrels are better able to survive winter conditions. They produce more young and can live at higher densities. Gray squirrels also carry the squirrelpox virus, to which red squirrels have no immunity. When an infected gray squirrel introduces squirrelpox to a red squirrel population, its decline is 17–25 times greater than through competition alone.

In Ireland, the displacement of red squirrels has not been as rapid because only a single introduction occurred, in County Longford. Schemes have been introduced to control the population of gray squirrels in Ireland to encourage the native red squirrels. Eastern gray squirrels have also been introduced to Italy, and the European Union has expressed concern that they will similarly displace the red squirrel from parts of the European continent.

Displacement of red squirrels

In Britain and Ireland, the eastern gray squirrel is not regulated by natural predators, other than the European pine marten, which is generally absent from England and Wales. This has aided its rapid population growth and has led to the species being classed as a pest. Measures are being devised to reduce its numbers, including a campaign starting in 2006 named “Save Our Squirrels” using the slogan "Save a red, eat a grey!" which attempted to re-introduce squirrel meat in to the local market, with celebrity chefs promoting the idea, cookbooks introducing recipes containing squirrel and the Forestry Commission providing a regular supply of squirrel meat to British restaurants, factories and butchers. In areas where relict populations of red squirrels survive, such as the islands of Anglesey, Brownsea and the Isle of Wight, programs exist to eradicate gray squirrels and prevent them from reaching these areas in order to allow red squirrel populations to recover and grow.

Although complex and controversial, the main factor in the eastern gray squirrel's displacement of the red squirrel is thought to be its greater fitness, hence a competitive advantage over the red squirrel on all measures. Within 15 years of the grey squirrel's introduction to a red squirrel habitat, red squirrel populations are extinct. The eastern gray squirrel tends to be larger and stronger than the red squirrel and has been shown to have a greater ability to store fat for winter. Due to the lack of trees in their native Ireland for them to reside in, red squirrels are the only species being harmed by the invasion of grey squirrels. The squirrel can, therefore, compete more effectively for a larger share of the available food, resulting in relatively lower survival and breeding rates among the red squirrel. Parapoxvirus may also be a strongly contributing factor; red squirrels have long been fatally affected by the disease, while the eastern gray squirrels are unaffected, but thought to be carriers – although how the virus is transmitted has yet to be determined. Red squirrel extinction rates can be 20–25 times greater in areas with confirmed cases of squirrel pox than they are in areas without the disease. his competitive action done between these two squirrels is reasoned to qualify the eastern gray squirrel as a keystone species because since the eastern gray squirrel is coming and wiping out the red squirrels, there would be a reduced chance of competition hence more eastern gray squirrels will come in to Ireland. However, several cases of red squirrels surviving have been reported, as they have developed an immunity – although their population is still being massively affected. The red squirrel is also less tolerant of habitat destruction and fragmentation, which has led to its population decline, while the more adaptable eastern gray squirrel has taken advantage and expanded. Methods done to control this competition between these squirrels are that red squirrels should remain in their original habitats, such as Ireland, while the grey squirrels should be kept out of these places entirely as a means of controlling this squirrel competition.

Similar factors appear to have been at play in the Pacific region of North America, where the native American red squirrel has been largely displaced by the eastern gray squirrel in parks and forests throughout much of the region.

Ironically, "fears" for the future of the eastern gray squirrel arose in 2008, as the melanistic form (black) began to spread through the southern British population. In the UK, if a "grey squirrel" (eastern gray squirrel) is trapped, under the Wildlife and Countryside Act 1981, it is illegal to release it or to allow it to escape into the wild; instead, it is legally required be "humanely dispatched".

In the late 1990s, Italy's National Wildlife Institute and University of Turin launched an eradication attempt to halt the spread of gray squirrels in northwest Italy, but court action by animal rights groups blocked this. Hence gray squirrels are expected to cross the Alps into France and Switzerland in the next few decades.

Ecosystem 
Eastern Grey Squirrels are important to the ecosystem by eating a lot of seeds. By caching seeds, they help in the spread of tree seeds. Also, by eating truffles, they contribute to the spread of fungal spores. In addition, they are essential to the environment because they transport parasites. The ecology is influenced by the contribution of squirrels to nature. They support the environment by gathering seeds. While being gathered, the seeds are scattered in certain places. Even though the seeds are not helpful to the squirrels because they can't remember where they were hidden, they are still growing in nature. These seeds increase the diversity of trees by bringing additional trees into the environment. They are an important key to the forest ecosystem that they belong to.

Fossil record of the eastern gray squirrel 
Twenty different Pleistocene fauna specimens contain S. carolinensis, found in Florida and dated to be as early as the late Irvingtonian period. Body size seems to have increased during the early to middle Holocene and then decreased to the present size seen today.

As food

Gray squirrels were eaten in earlier times by Native Americans and their meat is still popular with hunters across most of their range in North America. Today, it is still available for human consumption and is occasionally sold in the United Kingdom. However, physicians in the United States have warned that squirrel brains should not be eaten, because of the risk that they may carry Creutzfeldt–Jakob disease.

See also

 Black squirrel, a melanistic subgroup 
 Western gray squirrel (Sciurus griseus)
 Arizona gray squirrel (Sciurus arizonensis)
 Mexican gray squirrel (Sciurus aureogaster)
 Tommy Tucker (squirrel), a celebrity eastern gray squirrel in the 1940s
 Pinto Bean (squirrel), a piebald eastern gray squirrel in Illinois that died in 2022

References

External links

 ARKive – Still photos and videos
 An Exotic Evolution: Black Squirrels Imported in Early 1900s Gain Foothold – an article from The Washington Post
 WildlifeOnline – Natural History of Tree Squirrels
 Smithsonian Eastern Gray Squirrel article
 Grey Squirrel feeding on peanuts in a British park
 Grey Squirrels, Fletcher Wildlife Garden

Eastern gray squirrel
Mammals of Canada
Mammals of the United States
Rodents of North America
Eastern gray squirrel
Eastern gray squirrel
Symbols of North Carolina